Świnki may refer to the following places:
Świnki, Kuyavian-Pomeranian Voivodeship (north-central Poland)
Świnki, Lublin Voivodeship (east Poland)
Świnki, Lubusz Voivodeship (west Poland)